Richard Gilbert Attreau (April 8, 1897 – July 5, 1964) was a Major League Baseball player. Attreau batted and threw left-handed.

He was born and died in Chicago, Illinois.

External links

Major League Baseball first basemen
Philadelphia Phillies players
1897 births
1964 deaths
Baseball players from Chicago
Scottdale Scotties players
American expatriate baseball players in Canada
Harrisburg Senators players
Indianapolis Indians players
Norfolk Tars players
Springfield Ponies players
Winnipeg Maroons (baseball) players